

List of speakers

See also
 List of minority leaders of the Georgia House of Representatives
 List of minority leaders of the Georgia State Senate
 List of presidents of the Georgia State Senate

References

G
speakers of the Georgia House of Representatives